William Leese (born 10 March 1961) is an English former footballer who played for Port Vale and the Cleveland Cobras in the late 1970s.

Career
Leese graduated through the Port Vale youth team to earn a loan move to American Soccer League side Cleveland Cobras in May 1978. He returned to Vale Park three months later and signed as a Port Vale professional in March 1979. His first team debut in the Fourth Division came on 1 December, in a 5–1 defeat by York City at Bootham Crescent. He was not selected by new boss John McGrath and instead was forced into retirement at the end of the 1979–80 season following an injury.

Career statistics
Source:

References

Footballers from Stoke-on-Trent
English footballers
Association football defenders
Port Vale F.C. players
English expatriate footballers
Expatriate soccer players in the United States
Cleveland Cobras players
English Football League players
American Soccer League (1933–1983) players
1961 births
Living people
English expatriate sportspeople in the United States